Alexander Dmitrievitch Malofeev (also Alexander Dmitrievitch Malofeyev; born 21 October 2001 in Moscow) is a Russian pianist.

Biography

Early life 
Alexander Malofeev was born to Dimitri Alexandrovitch Malofeev, an engineer, and Dr. Lyudmila Borisovna Malofeev. He has an older sister and a younger brother. He began studying piano at the age of five. By the age of seven, he became interested in the music of Tchaikovsky, Shostakovich, Mahler, Rachmaninov, and Prokofiev.

In 2014, Malofeev graduated with honors from the N. P. Osipov Children's Music School. He continued his studies with Elena Berezkina, who has the honorary title "Honoured Cultural Worker of the Russian Federation", at the Gnessin State Musical College in Moscow, graduating in 2019. He is currently studying at the Moscow Conservatory in the class of Sergei Dorensky, People's Artist of Russia.

Career 
Malofeev gained international recognition at the 8th International Tchaikovsky Competition for Young Musicians held in Moscow in 2014, where he won first prize and the Gold Medal. Two years later, he was awarded the Grand Prix at the 1st Grand Piano Competition – International Competition for Young Pianists in Moscow.

In 2019, he won second prize and silver medal at the 1st China International Music Competition. He is also the recipient of numerous other international prizes. At the opening of the International Piano Festival of Brescia and Bergamo in April 2017 in Italy, he was awarded the "Premio Giovane Talento Musicale dell'anno 2017" (Best Young Musician of 2017).

As a soloist, Malofeev has performed with Russia’s leading orchestras: the Mariinsky Theatre Orchestra, the Tchaikovsky Symphony Orchestra, the National Philharmonic of Russia, the Moscow Virtuosi, and the New Russia' State Symphony Orchestra under the batons of conductors such as Valery Gergiev, Kazuki Yamada, Yuri Tkachenko, and Vladimir Spivakov.

Malofeev's scheduled performance in early March 2022 with the Montreal Symphony Orchestra, to be led by renowned conductor Michael Tilson Thomas, was cancelled as a result of the Russian invasion of Ukraine, despite his public opposition to the war. Malofeev and Tilson Thomas were finally able to perform together at Tanglewood (summer home of the Boston Symphony Orchestra) in August 2022 where the young pianist delivered a performance of Rachmaninoff's Third Concerto.

Discography 
 Alexander Malofeev's debut; DVD; recorded by Master Performers label; Queensland Conservatorium Griffith University, Australia; June 2016.

References

External links 

 
 Malofeev at the Mariinsky Theatre

2001 births
Living people
Child classical musicians
Russian classical pianists
Male classical pianists
21st-century classical pianists
Musicians from Moscow
Gnessin State Musical College alumni
21st-century Russian male musicians